Fred MacLean may refer to:
 Fred M. MacLean (1898–1976), American set decorator
 Fred MacLean (Manitoba politician)